Li Chen (born 25 November 1996) is a Chinese footballer currently playing as a goalkeeper for Beijing Renhe.

Club career
Li made his debut in unusual circumstances on 29 May 2019 in a Chinese FA Cup game against Guangzhou Evergrande, coming on as an 83rd-minute substitute for Zhang Yufeng, a midfielder, despite being a goalkeeper. He played alongside fellow goalkeeper Liu Peng up front for Beijing, and was the third goalkeeper fielded by Beijing in that game, with Mou Pengfei playing in his regular position in goal.

Career statistics

Notes

References

External links

1996 births
Living people
Chinese footballers
Association football goalkeepers
Beijing Renhe F.C. players
Chinese Super League players